Standings and results of the Last 16 of the Eurocup Basketball 2009–10 basketball tournament.

All times given below are in Central European Time.

Group I

Game 1

Game 2

Game 3

Game 4

Game 5

Game 6

Group J

Game 1

Game 2

Game 3

Game 4

Game 5

Game 6

Group K

Game 1

Game 2

Game 3

Game 4

Game 5

Game 6

Group L

Game 1

Game 2

Game 3

Game 4

Game 5

Game 6

External links
Results

2009–10 Eurocup Basketball